Bohdíkov (until 1947 Český Bohdíkov) is a municipality and village in Šumperk District in the Olomouc Region of the Czech Republic. It has about 1,300 inhabitants.

Administrative parts
Villages of Komňátka and Raškov are administrative parts of Bohdíkov.

Twin towns – sister cities

Bohdíkov is twinned with:
 Nitrianske Sučany, Slovakia

References

External links

Villages in Šumperk District